Castriño de Conxo is a ruined site in Province of A Coruña, Galicia, Spain.

References

Archaeological sites in Galicia (Spain)
Buildings and structures in the Province of A Coruña